John McInnis (1879 – 1972) was a miner, business owner and MLA in British Columbia. He represented Grand Forks from 1907 to 1909 as a Socialist Party member. He later represented Fort George from 1945 to 1949 as a Co-operative Commonwealth Federation (CCF) Member of the Legislative Assembly of British Columbia.

McInnis was born on June 25, 1879 in Springton, Prince Edward Island and was educated there. McInnis came to British Columbia at the age of 20. He worked as a carpenter and miner at Phoenix and Greenwood from 1900 to 1910. McInnis was defeated when he ran for reelection in 1909. 

He then established a lumber business based in Prince George. 

McInnis ran unsuccessfully for the Cariboo federal seat in 1935 and for the Grand Forks seat in the provincial assembly in 1916 and again in 1937 before being elected in 1945. He was defeated when he ran for reelection in 1949 and 1952. In 1972, McInnis died in Prince George at the age of 92.

He died March 23, 1972.

John McInnis Jr. Secondary School was named in his honour.

References 

Year of birth uncertain
1972 deaths
British Columbia Co-operative Commonwealth Federation MLAs
20th-century Canadian politicians
British Columbia Socialist Party MLAs
1879 births